The Iwokrama Forest is a  nature reserve of central Guyana located in the heart of the Guiana Shield, one of the four last pristine tropical forests in the world (Congo, New Guinea, and the Amazon rainforest are the others). It represents an important transition zone in rainfall, landforms, human histories and biological communities.

The forest lies between 4° and 5° north latitude and 58.5 and 59.5 degrees west longitude.

The Iwokrama Forest is bordered to the west by the Pakaraima Mountains and to the east by the isolated highlands scattered through central-east Guyana. It is also bordered by savannahs in the southwest and northeast of Guyana. The Essequibo River forms the eastern boundary. The northern boundary is the Siparuni River. The Burro-Burro River runs through the centre, and most of its watershed is within the forest.

The area is covered with lowland tropical forest, and dominated by tall tropical trees with a dense canopy 20 to 30 metres (70 to 100 ft) high.

The Iwokrama Forest's ecosystem is located at the juncture of Amazonian and Guianan flora and fauna. As a result, it contains high species richness and several species of animals that are threatened or extinct across most of their former geographic ranges, like the giant anteater.

The Iwokrama Forest has the highest species richness for fish (over 420 described so far) and bats (90) for any area this size in the world. It also has extraordinarily high bird diversity (over 500). Iwokrama Forest has also been identified as a global hotspot for several plant families, including Lecythidaceae and Chrysobalanaceae.

At 300 metres high, the Iwokrama Mountains form the geographic focal point of the Iwokrama Forest. They once provided a "place of refuge" for the Macushi people. In 1996, The Iwokrama International Centre for Rain Forest Conservation and Development was established to manage the forest. The centre and the forest are named after this striking mountain formation.

References

External links

 Iwokrama International Centre for Rain Forest Conservation and Development 
 Iwokrama Field Station, Iwokrama Forest Reserve

Geography of Guyana
Natural history of Guyana
Protected areas of Guyana